The following is a list of awards and nominations for Robin Thicke, an American singer, songwriter and record producer.

American Music Awards 
The American Music Awards is an annual awards ceremony created by Dick Clark in 1973 and one of several annual major American music awards shows (among the others are the Grammy Awards, the MTV Video Music Awards etc.). Robin Thicke has been nominated four times.

|-
| 2007
| rowspan="3" |Robin Thicke
| New Artist of the Year
|
|-
| rowspan="4" |2013
| Favorite Pop/Rock Male Artist
| 
|-
| Favorite Soul/R&B Male Artist
| 
|-
| Blurred Lines
| Favorite Soul/R&B Album
|
|-
| "Blurred Lines" (feat. T.I. & Pharrell)
| Single of the Year
|
|-

ASCAP Rhythm & Soul Music Awards 
ASCAP honors its top members in a series of annual awards shows in seven different music categories: pop, rhythm and soul, film and television, Latin, country, Christian, and concert music. In addition, ASCAP inducts jazz greats to its Jazz Wall of Fame in an annual ceremony held at ASCAP's New York City offices and honors PRS members that license their works through ASCAP at an annual awards gala in London, England. Robin Thicke has won the award once.

|-
| 2008
| "Lost Without U"
| Top R&B/Hip-Hop Song
|
|-

BET Awards 
The BET Awards were established in 2001 by the Black Entertainment Television network to celebrate African Americans and other minorities in music, acting, sports, and other fields of entertainment over the past year. Robin Thicke has been nominated three times.

|-
|rowspan="2"|2007
| Robin Thicke
| Best R&B Artists
|
|-
| "Lost Without U"
| Viewer's Choice
|
|-
| 2012
| Robin Thicke
| Centric Award
|
|-
|2014
|"Blurred Lines" (feat. T.I. & Pharrell)
|Best Collaboration
|

Billboard Music Awards 

|-
|rowspan="7"|2014
|rowspan="5"| "Blurred Lines" (with T.I., Pharrell Williams)
|Top Radio Song
|
|-
|Top Digital Song
|
|-
|Top Hot 100 Song
|
|-
|Top Streaming Song (Audio)
|
|-
|Top R&B Song
|
|-
|Blurred Lines
|Top R&B Album
|
|-
|Robin Thicke
|Top R&B Artist
|
|-
|}

Grammy Awards 
The Grammy Awards are awarded annually by the National Academy of Recording Arts and Sciences of the United States for outstanding achievements in the music industry. Considered the highest music honor, the awards were established in 1958. Thicke has been nominated five times.

|-
|2005
|Confessions (as producer)
|rowspan="2"|Album of the Year
|
|-
|2009
|Tha Carter III (as producer and featured artist)
|
|-
|rowspan="3"|2014
|rowspan="2"|"Blurred Lines" (featuring T.I. and Pharrell)
|Record of the Year
|
|-
|Best Pop Duo/Group Performance
|
|-
|Blurred Lines
|Best Pop Vocal Album
|
|-
|}

iHeartRadio Music Awards 

|-
|rowspan="4"|2014
|rowspan="3"| "Blurred Lines" (with T.I., Pharrell Williams)
|Song of the Year
|
|-
|Best Hip Hop/R&B Song of the Year
|
|-
|Best Collaboration
|
|-
|Robin Thicke
|Artist of the Year
|
|-
|}

Juno Awards 
The Juno Awards are presented annually to musicians to acknowledge artistic and technical achievements in all aspects of Canadian music. Robin Thicke has been nominated once.

|-
| 2012
|"Pretty Lil' Heart" (feat. Lil Wayne)
|R&B/Soul Recording of the Year
|
|-
|rowspan="3"|2014
|rowspan="2"| Robin Thicke
|Artist of the Year
|
|-
|Fan Choice Award
|
|-
|Blurred Lines
|Pop Album of the Year
|
|}

MOBO Awards 

|-
|2007
|"Lost Without U"
|Best Song
|
|-
|}

MTV Awards

MTV Video Music Award 

|-
|2007
| Robin Thicke
|Male Artist of the Year
|
|-
|rowspan="3"|2013
|rowspan="3"| "Blurred Lines" (featuring T.I. & Pharrell)
|Video of the Year
|
|-
|Best Male Video
|
|-
|Best Collaboration
|
|-
|}

MTV Europe Music Awards 

|-
|rowspan="4"|2013
|rowspan="2"|"Blurred Lines" (with T.I., Pharrell Williams)
|Best Song
|
|-
|Best Video
|
|-
|Robin Thicke
|Best United States Act
|
|-
|Performance at World Stage Malaysia
|Best World Stage Performance
|
|-
|}

NAACP Image Awards 

|-
|rowspan="4"|2014
|rowspan="2"| "Blurred Lines" (with T.I., Pharrell Williams)
|Outstanding Duo, Group or Collaboration
|
|-
|Outstanding Song
|
|-
|Blurred Lines
|Outstanding Album
|
|-
|Robin Thicke
|Outstanding Male Artist
|
|-
|}

NME Awards 

|-
|2014
|Robin Thicke
|Villain of the Year
|
|-
|}

NRJ Music Awards 

|-
|rowspan="2"|2014
|Robin Thicke & Pharrell Williams
|International Duo/Group of the Year
|
|-
|Robin Thicke
|International Male Artist of the Year
|
|-
|}

O Music Awards 

|-
|2013
|"Blurred Lines" (with T.I., Pharrell Williams)
|Too Much Ass for TV (NSFW Music Videos)
|
|-
|}

People's Choice Awards 

|-
|rowspan="2"|2014
|Robin Thicke
|Favorite R&B Artist
|
|-
|Blurred Lines
|Favorite Album
|
|-
|}

Premios 40 Principales 
Los Premios 40 Principales were created in 2006 by Spanish radio station Los 40 Principales as part of the celebrations of the 40th anniversary of its foundation. Thicke has received one nomination.

|-
|2013
|Blurred Lines
|Best International Song
|
|-

Soul Train Music Awards 
The "Soul Train Music Awards" is an annual award show which previously aired in national television syndication, and honors the best in music and entertainment. Robin Thicke has won the award twice from eight nominations.

|-
|2007
|The Evolution of Robin Thicke
| Best R&B/Soul Album, Male
|
|-
|2009
|rowspan="3"| Robin Thicke
|rowspan="3"|Best Male R&B/Soul Artist
|
|-
|2012
|
|-
|rowspan="5"|2013
|
|-
|rowspan="4"|"Blurred Lines" (feat. T.I. & Pharrell)
|Best Collaboration
|
|-
|Best Dance Performance
|
|-
|Song of the Year
|
|-
|Video of the Year
|
|}

Teen Choice Awards 

|-
|rowspan="2"|2007
| Robin Thicke
|Choice Music: Breakout Artist – Male
|
|-
|"Lost Without U"
|Choice Music: Love Song
|
|-
|rowspan="3"|2013
|| Robin Thicke
|Choice Music: Male Artist
|
|-
|rowspan="2"| "Blurred Lines" (feat. T.I. & Pharrell)
|Choice Music: Single – Male Artist
|
|-
|Choice Summer: Song
|
|-
|}

World Music Awards 

|-
|2008
| Robin Thicke
|World's Best Selling R&B Male
|
|-
|}

References 

Thicke, Robin